Juan de la Torre y Castro or Juan de la Torres y Castro (1607 – December 1662) was a Roman Catholic prelate who served as Bishop of Nicaragua (1661–1662).

Biography
Juan de la Torre y Castro was born in Arrancarra de Aranxo, Spain and ordained a priest in the Order of Friars Minor.
On 19 December 1661, he was appointed during the papacy of Pope Alexander VII as Bishop of Nicaragua. In 1662, he was consecrated bishop by Diego Osorio de Escobar y Llamas, Bishop of Puebla. He died six days after arriving in Nicaragua in December 1662. Alfonso Bravo de Laguna, who served as Vicar Capitular since 1660 after the death of Tomás Manso, was appointed the next Bishop.

References

External links and additional sources
 (for Chronology of Bishops) 
 (for Chronology of Bishops) 

17th-century Roman Catholic bishops in Nicaragua
Bishops appointed by Pope Alexander VII
1607 births
1662 deaths
Franciscan bishops
Roman Catholic bishops of León in Nicaragua